Petit-Goâve Football Club (formerly Association Sportive Petit-Goâve) is a professional football club based in Haiti. As of 2015, they play in the top flight league of Haiti.

History
The club was founded in 2011 as Association Sportive Petit-Goâve before undergoing a change in 2014 to its current name.

References

Football clubs in Haiti
Association football clubs established in 2011